Felix Bernstein may refer to:

Felix Bernstein (mathematician) (1878–1956), German mathematician
Felix Bernstein (artist) (born 1992), American artist